Local elections were held in Marilao, Bulacan, on May 10, 2010, within the Philippine general election. The voters (Marileños) will elect for the elective local posts in the municipality: the mayor, vice mayor, and eight councilors.

Mayoral and vice mayoral election
Incumbent Mayor Epifanio Guillermo and Vice Mayor Tito Santiago will run for their third term as Mayor and Vice Mayor of Marilao, Bulacan under the Liberal Party.

DZMM radio anchor Neil Ocampo will run for mayor against Guillermo under the banner of the Nacionalista Party.

Former Boardmember Johnny Zamora will run for mayor against Guillermo under the banner of the Pwersa ng Masang Pilipino

Results
The candidates for mayor and vice mayor with the highest number of votes wins the seat; they are voted separately, therefore, they may be of different parties when elected.

Mayoral and vice mayoral elections

Municipal Council election
Voting is via plurality-at-large voting: Voters vote for eight candidates and the eight candidates with the highest number of votes are elected.

External links
Official website of the Commission on Elections
 Official website of National Movement for Free Elections (NAMFREL)
Official website of the Parish Pastoral Council for Responsible Voting (PPCRV)

Results
Philippines 2010 Election Results - Main Site
Philippines 2010 Election Results - Alternate Site
PPCRV Map Viewer - PPCRV Encoded Site
PPCRV Map Viewer - PPCRV Site
NAMFREL - 2010 PARALLEL COUNT - NAMFREL Site
HALALAN 2010: Latest Comelec official results - ABS-CBN Site
ELEKSYON 2010: National Election Results Tally - GMA Site

Media websites
Halalan 2010 - Election coverage by ABS-CBN
Eleksyon 2010- Election coverage by GMA Network
Hatol ng Bayan (Auto-Vote 2010)- Election coverage by NBN-4, RPN-9 and IBC-13

2010 Philippine local elections
Elections in Marilao